The Lykan HyperSport is a Lebanese limited-production sports car manufactured by W Motors, a United Arab Emirates-based company, founded in 2012 in Lebanon with the collaboration of Lebanese and Italian engineers. It is the first sports car to be designed indigenously in the Middle East; however, the bodywork, chassis and engine were all produced in Germany and assembled in Italy. 

The production of the car was limited to a total of seven units. The first pre-production Lykan HyperSport was unveiled to the public at the Qatar Motor Show in February 2013.

Pricing and sales
At 3.4 million, the Lykan HyperSport was the third most expensive production car at the time of its production. The HyperSport is the first car to have headlights with embedded jewels; they contain titanium LED blades with 440 platinum diamonds (15cts); although buyers had a selection of rubies, diamonds, yellow diamonds, and sapphires to be integrated into the vehicle's headlights at purchase based on the colour choice. The car also uses a holographic display system on the centre console with interactive motion features, as well as gold stitching on the seats. In June 2015, the Abu Dhabi Police purchased a Lykan HyperSport. The Abu Dhabi Police car is included in the total of seven, meaning only six were available for purchase by customers.

Specifications

Exterior 
The HyperSport features rear hinged, upward opening doors which W Motors describes as patented "reverse dihedral doors".

Powertrain 
The engine has a mid-rear mounted position and transfers power to the rear wheels. There have been no independent tests of the power output of the vehicle.

Transmission 
The Lykan HyperSport was available with either a 6-speed sequential manual or a 7-speed dual-clutch PDK transmission. The transmission is paired with a limited-slip differential and is mounted longitudinally at the rear of the car.

Suspension 
The Lykan HyperSport uses a MacPherson strut suspension on the front axle, and multi-link suspension with horizontal coil over shock absorbers at the rear axle. Anti-roll bars are also installed at both axles.

Wheels 
The Lykan HyperSport is equipped with forged aluminium wheels with diameters of 19 inches at the front and 20 inches at the rear. The tyres are Pirelli P Zeros with codes of 255/35 ZR 19 for the front and 335/30 ZR 20 for the rear. The brakes have ventilated ceramic composite discs, with a diameter of 380 mm each and use six-piston aluminium callipers at the front and rear.

Performance
There was a demonstration of the car by W Motors in 2013 in Dubai, in which they claim to have recorded the car's performance.

Film version
A Lykan HyperSport was featured in the film Furious 7. The film's car coordinator Dennis McCarthy explained in an interview that the Lykan HyperSports used in the film were not production models but purpose-built by W Motors for the film using the same moulds, but cheaper material (fibreglass instead of carbon fibre) and a simpler chassis. Of the ten produced for the film, one was returned to W Motors and is displayed in their showroom. The other nine were destroyed during the course of filming.

Several Lykan HyperSport replicas were also used in the 2018 British Fast & Furious Live show. At least one has since been sold and was imported to the United States by Sam Hard (Hard Up Garage) and Ed Bolian (VINwiki). It will be built into a driveable car using an extensively modified Porsche Boxster chassis by Casey Putsch and Genius Garage under license from W Motors. The build is being documented on YouTube.

Gallery

References

External links

Cars introduced in 2013
Rear mid-engine, rear-wheel-drive vehicles
Sports cars
Science and technology in Lebanon
First car made by manufacturer
Cars powered by boxer engines